Darwen is a market town and civil parish in the Blackburn with Darwen borough in Lancashire, England. The residents of the town are known as "Darreners".
The population of Darwen stood at 28,046 in the 2011 census. The town comprises four wards and has its own town council.

The town stands on the River Darwen, which flows from south to north and is visible only in the outskirts of the town, as within the town centre it runs underground.

Toponym
Darwen's name is Celtic in origin. In Sub Roman Britain it was within the Brythonic kingdom of Rheged, a successor to the Brigantes tribal territory. 
The Brythonic language name for oak is derw and this is etymologically linked to Derewent (1208), an ancient spelling for the River Darwen. Despite the area becoming part of the Anglo-Saxon Kingdom of Northumbria by the mid-8th century, its Brythonic name was never supplanted by an Old English place name.

History 

The area around Darwen has been inhabited since the early Bronze Age, and the remains of a round barrow from approximately 2000 BCE have been partially restored at the Ashleigh Barrow in Whitehall. The barrow had ten interments, nine of which were Collared Urn burials. As well as human remains, items found at the barrow included a bronze dagger some 7.5 inches in length, a flint thumb scraper, a sub-plano-convex knife and a clay bead. Copies of the Collared Urns may be seen at the Darwen Library.

The Romans once had a force in Lancashire, and a Roman road is visible on the Ordnance Survey map of the area. Medieval Darwen was tiny and little or nothing survives. One of the earliest remaining buildings is a farmhouse at Bury Fold, dated 1675. Whitehall Cottage is thought to be the oldest house in the town, and was mostly built in the 17th and 18th centuries but contains a chimney piece dated 1557.

Like many towns in Lancashire, Darwen was a centre for textile manufacture during the Industrial Revolution. Samuel Crompton, inventor of the spinning mule, lived there for part of his life. Rail links and the Leeds and Liverpool Canal arrived in the mid-19th century. The most important textile building in Darwen is India Mill, built by Eccles Shorrock & Company. The company was ruined, however, by the effects of the Lancashire Cotton Famine of the 1860s. Cotton manufacture was an important industry, and by 1907, the Darwen Weavers', Winders' and Warpers' Association had more than 8,000 members in the town.

Much of the town was built between about 1850 and 1900; placenames, date stones in terraces, and the vernacular architecture of cellars, local stone, locally-made brick, pipework and tiles and leaded glass, the last now mostly gone, reflect this. It was one of the first places in the world to have steam trams.

Andrew Carnegie financed a public library here; the town also had an art and technology college and a grammar school.

In 1931, Darwen was visited by Mahatma Gandhi, he had accepted the invitation from Corder Catchpool, Quaker manager of the Spring Vale Garden Village Ltd, to see the effects of India's boycott of cotton goods.

India Mill is now home to many companies, including Brookhouse (producers of aeroplane parts) and Capita Group, which runs TV licensing. Since the 1950s, the textile industry has strongly declined in the region, although many industrial buildings from the period survive, now used for other purposes. India Mill and its chimney have been sold in a £12 million deal.

Among Darwen's other notable industries are Crown Paints, formerly Walpamur Paints, the earliest British paint manufacturer, which named one of its paints 'Darwen Satin Finish'. Crown Wallpaper manufactured wallpaper, Lincrusta and Anaglypta in the town. ICI Acrylics (now called Lucite International) was where acrylic glass (Perspex for windows and signage, and Sani-ware or Lucite used for the manufacture of baths and shower trays) was invented; it is still manufactured in two separate plants within the town. Spitfire canopies and (later) coloured polythene washing-up bowls were first made here.

Governance 

The municipal borough of Darwen existed for ninety-six years, from 1878. The borough was merged with Blackburn in 1974 under the Local Government Act 1972. The town became part of the Lancashire non-metropolitan district of Blackburn, which was renamed Blackburn with Darwen in 1997, shortly before it became a unitary authority.

The population of the town declined from 40,000 in the 1911 census to 30,000 in the 1971 census.

Locally, Darwen has been represented by Labour, Conservative and Liberal Democrat councillors in the main council wards for the town. In the 2008 local elections, the For Darwen Party picked up the majority of the wards in the town to put pressure on Blackburn with Darwen Borough Council for Darwen to have its own council again. In June 2009 Darwen Town Council was formed.

There are five council wards within Darwen out of the 23 in the Borough of Blackburn with Darwen. These are:
Earcroft
Marsh House
Sudell
Sunnyhurst
Whitehall

Darwen had its own parliamentary constituency until 1983 when it became part of the present Rossendale and Darwen constituency. This seat is currently held by Member of Parliament Jake Berry.

Coat of arms 

The coat of arms for Darwen should not be confused with the coat of arms used by the unitary authority of Blackburn with Darwen, which is the coat of arms for Blackburn.

Darwen was granted its coat of arms on 7 August 1878. At the foot of the coat of arms is the town motto in Latin Absque Labore Nihil, which translates as "Nothing without labour". The arms depicts three cotton bolls and the River Darwen which runs through the town. The cotton represents the cotton industry in which the town grew and prospered during the Industrial Revolution and the three bolls to represent the three main areas of Darwen - Over Darwen, Lower Darwen and Hoddlesden. At the helm of the coat of arms is a barred helmet representing nobility, and above it the torse in the town colours of blue and gold. At the crest a man stands shouldering a pickaxe, which refers to the town's motto and also represents the mining industry that was present to the east of the town at that time.

Education 

After the passing of the Education Act 1870, many schools were established to serve the ever-growing population. Many were later demolished.

Darwen Aldridge Community Academy opened in September 2008 at the premises of the former Darwen Moorland High School on the outskirts of the town, which had closed in July 2008 to reopen as the academy after the summer holidays. All pupils from Darwen Moorland transferred to the academy. Pupils have subsequently moved down to the new site, into a state-of-the-art £49m academy, with sixth form and modern facilities.

Darwen Vale High School was temporarily moved to the old Moorland site whilst a new build was completed on the original site. The original school façade was incorporated into the new build, and Darwen Vale transferred back to the original site in 2012. However, the move had caused major issues with the management at the school, which led to the head leaving and a new head taking over in 2013. Later in 2013, Ofsted ruled that the school was failing and the government ordered the school's conversion to academy status, sponsored by the Aldridge Foundation , despite teaching staff and parents protesting governmental imposition on the school's management.

In September 2013 Darwen Aldridge Enterprise Studio opened and in 2014 the school moved to its permanent home in the renovated former Model Lodging House on Police Street.

Geography

Location 

Darwen is located amid the West Pennine Moors south of Blackburn, it stands within a valley with the River Darwen flowing at its base. The river passes through the town from south to north, subsequently joining the River Ribble, which flows into the Irish Sea between Lytham St Annes and Southport. The A666 road follows the valley through the town centre as part of its route from the Ribble Valley, north of Blackburn, to Bolton and the boundary between Pendlebury and Irlams o' th' Height in Salford. The town's weather conditions made it perfect for cotton weaving and as a result it became one of the largest mill towns in Lancashire.

The Guinness Book of Records records that Darwen had one of the largest flash floods in the United Kingdom, in 1848; 12 people died.

Landmarks

Darwen Jubilee Tower 

In 1897 the town council met to deliberate how best to celebrate Queen Victoria's Diamond Jubilee. The idea of building the Jubilee Tower, in conjunction with public access to the moors, was put forward. A competition to design the tower was won by Ralph Ellison from the borough engineer's department and on 22 June 1897 work began. On 24 September 1898 the opening ceremony was held, attended by over 3,000 people. Present at the ceremony were Councillor Alexander Carus, Mayor Charles Huntington, the High Sheriff of Lancashire and Lord of the Manor Rev. W.A. Duckworth.

The tower, which is open to the public, overlooks the town from the moors and stands at an altitude of 1,227 ft (374m) and has a height of 85 ft (26m). A spiral staircase leads to the top from where, on a clear day, Blackpool Tower, the Isle of Man, North Wales and the Furness Peninsula can be seen. In November 2010 the dome of the tower was blown off by strong winds. The dome was restored in January 2012.

Darwen Library 

Originally situated in the Peel Street Baths (now McColl's supermarket in the Circus), the library was transferred to the new technical school building in 1895. 

Today, Darwen Library stands at the corner of Knott Street and School Street to the north of the Circus. It was commissioned by Andrew Carnegie, a Scottish migrant to the USA who made his fortune as a producer of iron and steel. He donated £8,000 in response to a speculative appeal for funds by the Library Committee. The opening took place on 27 May 1908 and was attended by Mayor Councillor G.P. Holde, Councillor Ralph Yates and Carnegie himself. The library has served the town ever since, with the original lecture hall being transformed into the Library Theatre in June 1971.  On 27 April 2017 the library and theatre were designated as a Grade II listed building.

Darwen Town Hall 

Darwen Town Hall was opened on 11 July 1882 and the clock tower was added in 1899 when Dr. James Ballantyne became mayor. In the 1920s part of the market ground was made into the town's bus station which still remains today. Although local government proceedings were transferred to Blackburn in the 1970s, the council chambers remained in the building, and were used by the magistrates' court from 1983 until 1992. The town hall currently houses offices of Blackburn with Darwen Borough Council and the local Neighbourhood Policing Team, and is a venue for meetings of the Darwen Town Council established in 2009. Five shop units opened in 2011.

Parks 

Darwen has four parks. Three of the parks in Darwen are on the west of the main road through the town, with paths leading to countryside and to Jubilee Tower. The fourth, and newest park, is Ashton Park, which is on the east side of Bolton Road, just behind the Spinners Arms public house.

Bold Venture Park 

Bold Venture Park stands to the west of the town, at the foot of the moors and the path which leads to the Jubilee Tower. The land in which the park lies was bought by Darwen Corporation from Rev. W.A. Duckworth. It was designed by R. W. Smith-Saville, the borough engineer, and opened in 1889.

Sunnyhurst Wood 
Sunnyhurst Wood was originally owned by the Brock-Hollinshead family and used for hunting stag. The area was later sold to Eccles Shorrock. To commemorate the coronation of Edward VII the land was turned into a public park on 2 July 1903.

Whitehall Park 
Whitehall Park is a  park in the south of the town. It was opened in 1879 on land acquired from John Adamson.

Transport 

Darwen sits in a large valley strung along the A666 road along the valley floor. It is connected to the motorway system at Junction 4 of the M65 at Earcroft, on the town's northern boundary, and considerable traffic passes through the town centre along the A666, causing high levels of air pollution. The local council has recently attempted to address the situation by adding a new road layout to the town centre, with public transport and junction improvements to reduce traffic.

Darwen stands along the Ribble Valley railway line, operated by Northern. Darwen railway station has up to two trains per hour between Blackburn and Rochdale (via Bolton and Manchester); one train per hour continues beyond Blackburn to Clitheroe.

Darwen's bus terminal (Darwen Circus) hosts buses up to every 12 minutes to Blackburn/Accrington on weekdays. There is also a service, every 20 minutes on weekdays and hourly on Sundays, to Bolton and Clitheroe, but the Bolton service terminates at 7:00pm. Both services are operated by Blackburn Bus Company.

In 2008 the "Pennine Reach" scheme, to improve public transport between Darwen, Blackburn and Hyndburn, was proposed by Lancashire and Blackburn with Darwen councils, including plans for the addition of bus lanes to the A666. However, it has been controversial, with some residents placing "Say no to Bus Lane, we don't want it" signs in their windows, and the neighbouring district of Hyndburn pulled out of the scheme. The scheme was put on hold in 2010 as local authorities reviewed their spending after their budgets were cut, before being abandoned later in the year due to lack of government funding, and the councils are now looking at other ways to improve public transport.

In 2004 Crown Wallcoverings, previously one of the biggest businesses in the town, closed with the loss of more than 200 jobs. The Crown building was a large redbrick ten-storey building with numerous chimneys. In 2006 the empty building and the 200 foot (60 m) chimney was demolished.

Culture and community 

The Darwen News published a Maudley Medley on 9 March 1878:

'Tween two hillsides, both bleak and barren,
Lies lovely little "Dirty Darren" 

In Lancashire dialect, the name Darwen is pronounced Darren, and the locals refer to themselves as Darreners. They are generally resistant to any attempts at submerging the identity of the town within Blackburn. A motorway service area at junction 4 of the M65 motorway lies within the town, and was originally named "Blackburn Services". Following local protests it was renamed "Blackburn with Darwen Services".

The town is the home of the Darwen Library Theatre (an extension to the library), and the TV show Hetty Wainthropp Investigates.
Darwen has a few footnotes in entertainment history: its theatre (now demolished) had appearances by Charlie Chaplin, and it featured in the film, There Was a Crooked Man, which starred Norman Wisdom and Alfred Marks.

The Beatles played in Darwen on Friday 25 January 1963, at the Co-operative Hall. They headlined "The Greatest Teenage Dance" which was commissioned by the Darwen Baptist Youth Club. Support acts included the Electones, the Mike Taylor Combo and the Mustangs with Ricky Day.

Religion 

The Parish Church of Darwen is St Peter's, a large and active Anglican church consecrated in 1829.

The Medina Mosque and Islamic Centre, Darwen's first  mosque, is located on Victoria Street.

Faizaan e Jamal e Mustafa , Darwen's second mosque, is located on railway road. It was opened in 2018.

Music 

Darwen has its own music school, Darwen School of Music (formerly Elite School of Music), situated on Blackburn Road. The school has a majority focus on popular music.

Darwen Live (formerly Darwen Music Live) is a free two-day music festival held each year over the second bank holiday in May. The main stage is built outside the town hall, and other smaller music stages are usually based around the town in pubs and bars. The festival has attracted artists such as the Buzzcocks, China Crisis, Toyah and Paul Young, as well as being a showcase for local bands.

Darwen has one of the oldest brass bands in the country. Now named Blackburn and Darwen Band, its roots can be traced back to 1840. Another brass band, Darwen Brass, was formed in 2007 and under MD Steve Hartley has enjoyed many notable competition successes, including 4th section wins throughout the North West. In 2012 Darwen Brass qualified for the National Brass Band Championships, finishing 5th. The band was promoted to the 3rd section from the start of 2013.

Sport 

The town was the home of Darwen Football Club, formed in 1870 and the world's first football club to have paid professional players. The team reached the semi-final of the FA Cup in 1880-81 and played in the Football League at the Barley Bank ground between 1891 and 1899. The club was wound up at the end of the 2008–09 season and replaced almost immediately by A.F.C. Darwen. The new club plays in the First Division North of the North West Counties Football League and is based at the Anchor Ground.

The town has a strong cricketing tradition and Darwen Cricket Club was originally founded in the late 1800s as Darwen Etrurians CC playing at Barley Bank. The current club was constituted in 1911 and since 1920 has been based at Birch Hall Cricket Ground. The club was a founder member of the Northern League in 1951 winning that competition five times before successfully applying to play in the Lancashire League from the 2017 season. This change heralded a golden era for the club and within 5 seasons, it had won every club competition in the county. Twice holders of the Worsley Cup (2017 and 2019), T20 champions in 2021 and LCF Knockout Cup winners in 2018 with the set completed when crowned 2022 Lancashire League champions after defeating Greenmount by 13 runs on 4th September 2022. Past Professionals include David Wiese, George Linde (SA) Keith Semple (WI) and Scott Hookey (AUS). For the 2022 season, Mumbai batter, Siddhesh Lad (IND) was the club's paid man, scoring 1039 runs at an average of 57.72.

To the north-west of the town lies Darwen Golf Club. The characteristics of the course have changed little since the club was established in 1893. Due to its geographical location within the moors, the course is regarded as a tough test of golfing ability.

Until the sports centre was demolished, Darwen was home to the North West Open Karate tournament, which hosted many national and world champions. Tower Shukokai Karate Club was resident at the sports centre from 1988 and remains active. Tower's instructors, Andy Allwood, 5th Dan and Martyn Skipper 4th Dan, both won this tournament in their respective weight categories (Allwood, heavyweight, in the 1990s and Skipper, lightweight, in 2006 after the tournament had moved to Bury). In 2013 Martyn Skipper won the WUKF European Veterans' title when the European Championships were held in Sheffield.

Notable people 
Neil Arthur, lead vocalist of 1980s group Blancmange
 Alan Bolton, Lancashire county cricketer (1939-2003)
 Brian Booth, Lancashire and Leicestershire county cricketer (1935-2020)
Dick Burton, golf's Open champion, 1939 (who went on to hold the Claret Jug for seven years after the Championship was suspended because of the Second World War)
Ed Chapman (artist) born at Bull Hill, in Darwen, went to St. Cuthbert's Primary School 1975–81.
Margaret Chapman (née Duxbury), illustrator and painter  (1940–2000)
Samuel Crompton, inventor of the Spinning Mule built and lived at Low Hill House, Bury Fold Lane in Darwen.
 Alex Davies, cricketer (born 1994)
Charles Fletcher-Cooke, MP for Darwen from 1951 - 1983, was responsible for the Suicide Act (1961), which decriminalised the act of suicide in the UK.
Edward Harwood, composer (1707–1787)
Bryn Haworth, British singer-songwriter and acclaimed slide guitarist and mandolin player was brought up in Darwen (born 1948)
Alan Kendall Lead guitarist with the Bee Gees between 1971-1980 and 1987-2001(born 1944)
Timothy Marsden (1865–1932), footballer
Mark Patterson, Premiership football player for Blackburn Rovers, Bolton Wanderers. Born 1965
Harold Readett (1910-1990), football player in the 1930s.
Fergus Suter, footballer. Joined Darwen FC in 1878 from Partick and is widely regarded as the world's first professional footballer (1857-1916)
Kimmie Taylor (born 1989), English fighter with the Kurdish Women's Protection Units
Richard Thornber (1866–1911), footballer
Sam Wadsworth, England international footballer 1922–26, was captain of the England team and a member of the Huddersfield Town team which won a hat-trick of Football League Championships in 1923–24, 1924–25 and 1925–26.
James Watson, award-winning author (born 1936)

Twin towns 

  Lamin, Gambia

Photo gallery

See also 

Listed buildings in Darwen
Darwen Cemetery

References

External links 

 Photographs showing the history and heritage of Darwen
 "India Mill, Darwen" Frank Wightman (1980) Manchester Archives+

 
Market towns in Lancashire
West Pennine Moors
Geography of Blackburn with Darwen
Towns in Lancashire